Brian Rupp (born September 20, 1971) is the hitting coach of the Potomac Nationals in the Washington Nationals organization, he resides in Florissant, MO with his wife Stacie and son Andrew. The 2012 campaign will be Rupp's first season in the Nationals organization and twelfth as a minor league manager. His career managerial record sits at 579-560 (.508). His resume also boasts five playoff appearances, two trips to a league final and one championship. After attending UM-St. Louis, Rupp was drafted by the St. Louis Cardinals in the 43rd round of the 1992 draft, he played for seven seasons in the St. Louis Cardinals minor league system, mostly as a first baseman and outfielder. He reached as high as the Triple-A level. The former University of Missouri-St. Louis Triton won both the Arizona League batting title and MVP award in his first professional season. He also collected the South Atlantic League batting crown in 1993 beating out Derek Jeter. He went on to hit .295 over 742 career games.

After his playing career, Rupp joined the Cardinals minor league coaching staff and served as manager for Low-A Peoria (1999), Short-Season New Jersey (2001) and Rookie Johnson City (2002). He also spent the 2000 season as hitting coach for Double-A Arkansas. After joining the Royals organization, he managed Idaho Falls Chukars from 2004 to 2007 before mentoring the Burlington Bees in 2008 during which Rupp led the Royals' Low A affiliate to a 73-65 regular-season record and their first Midwest League Championship since 1999. Under his tutelage, the Bees went from being the worst team in their division over the first half (30-39) to a league-best record and division title in the second half (43-26), winning the half crown by 3.5 games. The team played its best baseball in the final month of the season. Including a 6-0 playoff record, the Bees went 27-9 from August 1 on. The Midwest League named the Bees champions in a rain-shortened finale. In 2009 Rupp managed the Wilmington Blue Rocks to an 84-55 record and Northern Division Championship before losing to the eventual Carolina League Champion Lynchburg Hillcats in game 5 of the semi-finals playoff series. His team set franchise records for consecutive road wins by winning 12 straight games during the 2009 season. Rupp left the Royals organization after the 2010 season, switching affiliations to the Washington Nationals organization.

References

External links

Living people
1971 births
Baseball players from Missouri
Minor league baseball managers
Arizona League Cardinals players
Savannah Cardinals players
St. Petersburg Cardinals players
Arkansas Travelers players
Louisville Redbirds players
Memphis Redbirds players
Minor league baseball coaches